Shuhan-e Olya (also Romanized as Shūhān-e ‘Olyā; also known as Shāhūn-e ‘Olyā) is a village in Qeblehi Rural District, in the Central District of Dezful County, Khuzestan Province, Iran. At the 2006 census, its population was 594, in 121 families.

References 

Populated places in Dezful County